This is the list of notable stars in the constellation Camelopardalis, sorted by decreasing brightness.

See also 
 List of stars by constellation

References

Sources
 
 
 

List
Camelopardalis